Pean was a twelfth-century Roman Catholic Bishop of Poznan, Poland.

Little is known of his life career or episcopacy.  He is recorded as Chancellor of Prince Mieszko the Old in a document dated 2 March 1145, written by papal legate Cardinal Humbalda to the Abbey of Trzemesznie, near Gniezno.

He was bishop of Poznan from 1146 till 1152. The dates of his episcopacy in the Diocese of Poznan are reported in Annales Lubinensis. He is also known from the records of the Liber Lubinensis fraternity, which establishes that he was one of the benefactors of the Abbey of Lubin (pictured).  

He died on 16 April 1152.

References 

Bishops of Poznań
11th-century births
1152 deaths
12th-century Roman Catholic bishops in Poland